Lake Asbury is an unincorporated community and census-designated place (CDP) in Clay County, Florida, United States. The population was 8,700 at the 2010 census, which calls it Asbury Lake.

Geography
The community surrounds a small reservoir of the same name, though it has also recently expanded eastward. It is bordered on the north by Black Creek, a tributary of the St. Johns River.

Demographics

As of the census of 2010, there were 8,700 people, 2,848 households, and 2,450 families residing in the CDP, a 290% increase from 2000. The racial makeup of the CDP was 88.8% White, 5.7% African American, 0.5% Native American, 1.3% Asian, 1.1% from other races, and 2.4% from two or more races. Hispanic or Latino of any race were 7.0% of the population.

There were 799 households, out of which 30.7% had children under the age of 18 living with them, 80.0% were married couples living together, 5.4% had a female householder with no husband present, and 12.6% were non-families. 10.1% of all households were made up of individuals, and 5.1% had someone living alone who was 65 years of age or older.  The average household size was 2.79 and the average family size was 2.98.

In the CDP, the population was spread out, with 22.5% under the age of 18, 5.9% from 18 to 24, 23.9% from 25 to 44, 35.5% from 45 to 64, and 12.2% who were 65 years of age or older.  The median age was 44 years. For every 100 females, there were 101.8 males.  For every 100 females age 18 and over, there were 98.3 males.

The median income for a household in the CDP was $65,476, and the median income for a family was $70,278. Males had a median income of $47,000 versus $30,167 for females. The per capita income for the CDP was $26,398.  About 4.2% of families and 3.8% of the population were below the poverty line, including 2.2% of those under age 18 and 4.9% of those age 65 or over.

References

External links
 Lake Asbury community website

Census-designated places in Clay County, Florida
Census-designated places in the Jacksonville metropolitan area
Census-designated places in Florida
Unincorporated communities in Clay County, Florida
Unincorporated communities in the Jacksonville metropolitan area
Unincorporated communities in Florida